Heaven is for Real: A Little Boy's Astounding Story of His Trip to Heaven and Back is a 2010 New York Times best-selling Christian book written by Todd Burpo and Lynn Vincent and published by Thomas Nelson Publishers. The book documents the report of a near-death experience by Burpo's three-year-old son Colton.

By April 2012, more than one million ebooks had been sold, and more than 10 million copies had been sold by 2014. A feature film based on the book was released on April 16, 2014, earning $101 million at the box office.

Summary
Todd Burpo and Lynn Vincent co-wrote  this book when Todd Burpo's three-year-old son had appendicitis. When Colton's mother Sonja first noticed he was not feeling well she took him to the emergency room and was told that Colton had influenza, as all the tests for a possible appendicitis came back negative. Colton vomited often, and his parents suspected he did not just have influenza. When Todd and Sonja went to a different emergency room with Colton, they were told that Colton had to have an emergency appendectomy or he could possibly die. Months after surviving the emergency surgery to remove his appendix, Colton shared the story of how he left his body during surgery and went to heaven. Colton began describing events and people that seemed impossible for him to have known about. Examples include knowledge of an unborn sister miscarried by his mother in 1998 and details of a great-grandfather who had died 30 years before Colton was born. Colton also explained how he met Jesus riding a rainbow-colored horse and sat in Jesus' lap while angels sang songs to him.

Characters
Colton Burpo is the son of Todd Burpo and Sonja Burpo. At the time of the incident, Colton was three years old, Todd Burpo was pastor at a Crossroads church in Nebraska, and Sonja Burpo was a teacher at a local school. Cassie Burpo is Colton's older sister. Pop was Todd Burpo's grandfather, and Dr. O’Holleran was the doctor who performed the emergency appendectomy on Colton.

Response

Sales
Within ten weeks of its November 2010 release, the book debuted at No. 3 on the New York Times bestseller list; by January 2011 there were 200,000 copies in print; and it reached No. 1 in the Times's best-selling non-fiction paperback category in March 2011, remaining in the top 10 for some weeks.

Criticism
A variety of Christians have expressed questions regarding  the book. The Berean Call, a Christian ministry and newsletter, cited the book for its "extra-biblical" and "problematic" claims, as well as the lack of any medical evidence that the boy was clinically dead during the surgery. Author and pastor John MacArthur has criticized the book for presenting an un-Biblical perspective on the afterlife. In an interview with The New Yorker magazine, Heaven Is for Real co-author Lynn Vincent expressed concern that Christians would find the book to be a "hoax" if she included people in heaven having wings.

In 2015, Alex Malarkey – a boy with a similar story to Colton Burpo's – publicly recanted his own story and book The Boy Who Came Back from Heaven, stating that his near-death experience described in that book was fictional, and condemned Christian publishers and bookstores for selling popular "heaven tourism" books, which he said "profit from lies." Following Malarkey's statement, Colton Burpo said that while he acknowledged that some among the public had doubts about his account, he stood by  Heaven Is for Real'''s contents nonetheless.

Awards
In less than just one year of being released, this book surpassed the 1 million sales and was awarded the Platinum sales Award. Then in 2014 after seeing 10 million copies, the book was then awarded the Diamond Sales Award.

Film adaptation

In May 2011, Sony Pictures acquired the film rights of the book. The film was released on April 16, 2014, starring Connor Corum, Margo Martindale, Greg Kinnear, Kelly Reilly, Thomas Haden Church, and Jacob Vargas. As of July 2014, Rotten Tomatoes rated it at 46%.  Critics praised the script and cast, but they were critical of heavy-handed exposition.

See alsoThe Boy Who Came Back from Heaven, a fabricated account of a near-death experience23 Minutes in Hell90 Minutes in HeavenMiracles from Heaven''
Proof of Heaven
Howard Storm (author)

References

External links
 Dancing Past The Dark website (by Nancy Evans Bush)

The Christian Post article on near-death experiences  (Criticism about near-death experiences.)
Heaven is for Real Jesus Painting

2010 non-fiction books
Non-fiction books adapted into films
Christian literature
Children and death
Heaven in popular culture
Books about near-death experiences
Thomas Nelson (publisher) books